Cashelnadrea or more usually, Cashel as it is known locally is a townland situated near Garrison, County Fermanagh. The area includes the subtownlands of Scribbagh, Kilcoo and Aghoo.

Information
The townland lies four miles from the village of Garrison and nine miles from both Belleek and Belcoo and one and half miles from the border with County Leitrim and the village of Kiltyclogher; however the border crossing was blocked during The Troubles by the British Army.

The area is rural, relying heavily on the farming, fishing and tourism industries. The area has also been recognised as an Area of Special Scientific Interest in 2012 by the Northern Ireland Executive due to the abundance of rare fossils discovered in a disused quarry. The area has also been found to contain high levels of shale gas reserves, and has been listed as a probable fracking site by the Tamboran company, a move which has been condemned by most locals.

The area is also home to the Corralea land and water adventure centre, which incorporates Upper Lough MacNean into its activities.

References

Townlands of County Fermanagh